Dennis Gansel (born 4 October 1973) is a German film director, writer and actor .

Life and career
Gansel was born in 1973 in Hannover, West Germany, where he graduated from high school in 1993. Gansel worked in the festivals for film and television and chose to dedicate  his compulsory service to helping  disabled people. During this time, he prepared himself for film school. He studied at University of Television and Film Munich for 5 years. Gansel is best known for directing The Wave and his following project; the vampire film We Are The Night, which starred Karoline Herfurth, Nina Hoss, Jennifer Ulrich, Anna Fischer and Max Riemelt.

Other than directing, Gansel has also tried acting. He has had several small roles in his own movies as wells as others.

Gansel frequently casts Max Riemelt in his films and frequently works with editor Jochen Retter and composer/musician Heiko Maile. His favourite director is Sydney Pollack.

Filmography

German Awards 
 F.W. Murnau Kurzfilmpreis for The Wrong Trip
 F.W. Murnau Kurzfilmpreis for Living Dead
 Adolf-Grimme-Preis 2001 for Das Phantom
 Bundesfilmpreis 2003 best unpicturized script for Before the Fall
 Bayerischer Filmpreis 2005 for Before the Fall
 Deutscher Filmpreis LOLA Bronze for The Wave
 Sitges - Special Prize of the Jury for We Are The Night

References

External links
 
 Website of Dennis Gansel

1973 births
German film directors
Living people
Actors from Hanover
Film people from Hanover